Marina Bastos Rodrigues (born 7 July 1971 in Albergaria-a-Velha) is a retired Portuguese athlete who specialised in the middle and long-distance events. She represented her country at three outdoor and four indoor World Championships.

Competition record

Personal bests
Outdoor
800 metres – 2:05.52 (1992)
1000 metres – 2:46.5 (1994)
1500 metres – 4:08.92 (Maia 1993)
One mile – 4:38.00 (Leiria 1999)
3000 metres – 8:38.13 (Seville 1999)
5000 metres – 15:07.29 (Oslo 1997)
10,000 metres – 31:41.38 (Barakaldo 1999)
10 kilometres – 32:20 (Amadora 2004)
Half marathon – 1:12:09 (1997)
Indoor
1500 metres – 4:28.62 (Braga 2007)
3000 metres – 8:49.55 (Lisbon 2001)

References

1971 births
Living people
People from Albergaria-a-Velha
Portuguese female middle-distance runners
Portuguese female long-distance runners
World Athletics Championships athletes for Portugal
Sportspeople from Aveiro District